A Charentais melon is a type of French cantaloupe, Cucumis melo var. cantalupensis.

It is a small variety of melon, around the size of a softball. It has flesh similar to most cantaloupes, but with a distinct and more intense aroma, and a more pink hue. It originated in the Charentes region of France, and is most associated with the Provençal area around the town of Cavaillon.  Most true Charentais melons are grown in and around this region, and are almost exclusively available in France, owing to the fact that their thin skin and soft flesh does not do well in shipping. Hybrids of this variety are widely grown, they are generally crosses with North American cantaloupes for better shipping characteristics and larger size.

External links
Specialty produce: Charentais Melon

Melons